Piletocera latalis is a moth in the family Crambidae. It was described by Francis Walker in 1866. It is found in the Sula Islands of Indonesia.

References

L
Endemic fauna of Indonesia
Moths of Indonesia
Moths described in 1866